The John Hunter House, also known as McCullough House, near Franklin, Tennessee is an Italianate style house that was built in 1875.  It was listed on the National Register of Historic Places (NRHP) in 1988.

The NRHP eligibility of this property and others was covered in a 1988 study of Williamson County historical resources.  The house was one of relatively few fine brick residences built in Williamson County, Tennessee, besides in Franklin, that were built from 1865 to 1937.  Another one, also in Italianate style, is the Andrew Vaughn House, also NRHP-listed.  Both "feature arched fenestration and
ornate eaves" and had had few changes since, as of the 1988 study.

The house was built or has other significance in c. 1875, c. 1890, and c. 1910.

References

Houses in Franklin, Tennessee
Houses on the National Register of Historic Places in Tennessee
Italianate architecture in Tennessee
Houses completed in 1875
National Register of Historic Places in Williamson County, Tennessee